Xantusia sherbrookei is a species of lizard in the family Xantusiidae. It is a small lizard found in the Baja California Peninsula of Mexico.

References

Xantusia
Endemic reptiles of Mexico
Endemic fauna of the Baja California Peninsula
Reptiles described in 2008
Taxa named by Robert L. Bezy